Dan Dugan may refer to:
Dan Dugan (baseball) (1907–1968), American baseball pitcher for the Chicago White Sox in 1928–29
Dan Dugan (audio engineer) (born 1943), American audio engineer, the inventor of the automixer
Dan Dugan, television producer associated with The Random Years and The Game